There are several types of Frisian houses in the Netherlands as well as in Germany.

Bildts farmhouse
Frisian farmhouse
Geestharden house
Gulf house
Old Frisian longhouse
Uthland-Frisian house

Houses
Architecture in Frisia